CBL-B is an E3 ubiquitin-protein ligase that in humans is encoded by the CBLB gene.  CBLB is a member of the CBL gene family.

Function 

CBL-B functions as a negative regulator of T-cell activation. CBL-B expression in T cells causes ligand-induced T cell receptor down-modulation, controlling the activation degree of T cells during antigen presentation.

Clinical significance 

Mutation of the CBLB gene has been associated with autoimmune conditions such as type 1 diabetes.

Interactions 

CBLB has been shown to interact with:
 CRKL,
 Epidermal growth factor receptor,
 Grb2,
 NEDD4,
 PIK3R1, and
 SH3KBP1.

References

External links

Further reading